Bevensen is a former Samtgemeinde ("collective municipality") in the district of Uelzen, in Lower Saxony, Germany. Its seat was in the town Bad Bevensen. At the 1 November 2011 local government reform, the Samtgemeinden Bevensen and Altes Amt Ebstorf merged to form the new Samtgemeinde Bevensen-Ebstorf.

Geography

Municipalities 
The Bevensen Samtgemeinde consisted of the following eight municipalities:

The villages in the eight municipalities:

Politics

Municipal council 
After the local elections of 10 September 2006 the municipal council was made up as follows:
 CDU: 13 seats
 SPD: 11 seats
 Greens: 3 seats
 Bad Bevensen independents: 3 seats
 FDP: 2 Sitze

The mayor also had a seat and a vote.

Notable residents
Josef Oberhauser (1915–1979), German Nazi SS concentration camp commandant and Holocaust perpetrator

References

Uelzen (district)
Former Samtgemeinden in Lower Saxony